Rattle of a Simple Man is a 1964 British comedy-drama film directed by Muriel Box and starring Diane Cilento, Harry H. Corbett and Michael Medwin, based on the 1963 play by Charles Dyer. The screenplay is about a naive man who becomes involved with a prostitute.

Premise
Percy Winthram is a 39-year-old socially inept, anxious virgin who pretends to be younger and travels by coach to London from Manchester with a group of friends to watch the FA Cup Final. The group have a night out in Soho and a £50 bet leads Percy to spend the evening with prostitute Cyrenne.

Selected cast
 Diane Cilento as Cyrenne
 Harry H. Corbett as Percy Winthram
 Michael Medwin as Ginger
 Thora Hird as Mrs. Winthram
 Charles Dyer as Chalky
 Hugh Futcher as Ozzie
 Carole Gray as District Nurse
 Barbara Archer as Iris
 David Saire as Mario
 Alexander Davion as Ricardo
 John Ronane as Willie
 Michael Robbins as George
 George Roderick as Papa
 Marie Burke as Mama
 Bryan Mosley as Mr. Stratton (uncredited)
 Marianne Stone as Barmaid
 Brian Wilde as Fred
 Ingrid Anthofer as 1st Stripper
 Karen Kaufman as 2nd Stripper
 Terence Brook as Strip Club Barman
 Eric Mason as Strip Club Doorman
 Thelma Taylor as Strip Club waitress
 David Burke as Jack
 Paul Ferris as Mike
 Frank Hawkins as Crying Man
 Roy Patrick as Sailor
 Doug Robinson as Big Joe
 Christine Taylor as Party Girl
 Marjie Lawrence as Barmaid (uncredited)

Production
Sydney Box emerged from a temporary retirement from filmmaking to buy the rights to the play for £50,000. Box originally wanted Peter Sellers for the lead role but he was too expensive.

Reception

Box office
The film was not a success at the box office.

Critical
Variety commented that "most of the charm and tenderness that occasionally illuminated Charles Dyer’s successful play has been lost in this coarsened, fatuous film. Only a lively, vivid performance by Diane Cilento in a contrived role holds much interest, though a sound cast does spartan work in juggling the sparse material"; while Sky Movies called it "a rather touching and at times richly amusing extended playlet about an 'innocent' football fan from the north, and the night he spends talking to a London prostitute in her flat. Not very plausible, perhaps, but winningly done. As Cyrenne, the streetwalker, Diane Cilento is persuasive and just right. And Harry H Corbett was able to break away completely from his Steptoe image. Michael Medwin is also very good as Corbett's big-talking friend."

References

External links
 
 
 

1964 films
1964 comedy-drama films
1960s sex comedy films
1960s English-language films
British association football films
British black-and-white films
British comedy-drama films
British films based on plays
British sex comedy films
Films about dysfunctional families
Films about prostitution in the United Kingdom
Films about virginity
Films directed by Muriel Box
Films set in London
Films shot at Associated British Studios
1960s British films